The Communist Party of Bohemia and Moravia (KSČM) held a leadership election on 14 May 2022. MEP Kateřina Konečná was reelected as the leader of KSČM.

Candidates
Kateřina Konečná, the incumbent leader.
Josef Skála, party's presidential nominee for Czech upcoming presidential election
Milan Krajča, deputy leader of party.

Voting
Konečná's rivals Skála and Krajča withdrawn from election before voting started. Konečná received 254 of 286 votes and won the election.

References

Communist Party of Bohemia and Moravia leadership elections
2022 elections in the Czech Republic
2022 in the Czech Republic
Indirect elections
Communist Party of Bohemia and Moravia leadership election